Carl Michael Paproski (January 25, 1945 – January 13, 2008) was a teacher and provincial level politician from Alberta, Canada. He served as a member of the Legislative Assembly of Alberta from 1982 to 1986 sitting with the governing Progressive Conservative caucus.

Political career
Paproski ran for a seat to the Alberta Legislature in the 1982 Alberta general election. He won the electoral district of Edmonton-Kingsway taking over from his brother Kenneth Paproski who held the district from 1971 to 1982.  Paproski won a tight race defeating future MLA Alex McEachern and five other candidates. He retired from provincial politics after serving only a single term at dissolution of the Legislature in 1986.

His other brother Steve Paproski also served as a Member of Parliament in the House of Commons of Canada from 1968 to 1993.

References

External links
Legislative Assembly of Alberta Members Listing

Progressive Conservative Association of Alberta MLAs
1945 births
2008 deaths
University of Alberta alumni
Canadian people of Ukrainian descent
Politicians from Edmonton